Witold Jan Waszczykowski (born 5 May 1957) is a Polish politician.  He was the Minister of Foreign Affairs between 2015 and 2018. Waszczykowski was a Member of the Sejm (2011–2019), and has been the Member of the European Parliament since 2019.

Life and career

Waszczykowski was born in Piotrków Trybunalski, Poland on 5 May 1957. He is a graduate of the University of Łódź, earning a Master's degree in history, and the University of Oregon, where he received a master's degree in international studies. Waszczykowski completed advanced studies at the Geneva Centre for Security Policy. He also holds a PhD in history from the University of Łódź.

He joined the Ministry of Foreign Affairs in 1992. Between 1997 and 1999 he was working at the Permanent Representation of Poland to NATO in Brussels as deputy chief of mission. From 1999 to 2002, Waszczykowski was the Ambassador of Poland to Iran. On 4 November 2005, he became Deputy Minister of Foreign Affairs. Waszczykowski served as the chief negotiator with the United States on missile defense. He served until 11 August 2008.

From 27 August 2008 to 6 July 2010, Waszczykowski was the Deputy Head of the National Security Bureau. In the 2011 parliamentary elections, he successfully ran for the Sejm. He was reelected in 2015.

Since 16 November 2015, Waszczykowski has been the Minister of Foreign Affairs in the Cabinet of Beata Szydło.

On 10 January 2017, he accidentally referred to the country of Saint Kitts and Nevis as "San Escobar" (the mistake reportedly stems from the islands' Spanish name, San Cristóbal y Nieves). This was immediately picked up by newspapers throughout the world, such as The Guardian, The Telegraph, The Washington Post, The New York Times, and Britské listy.

In 2019, he was elected member to the European Parliament, receiving 168 021 votes.

Waszczykowski has been also cooperating with the Sobieski Institute.

Positions held
Ambassador to Iran (1999 – 2002)
Deputy Minister of Foreign Affairs (4 November 2005 – 11 August 2008)
Deputy Head of the National Security Bureau (27 August 2008 – 6 July 2010)
Member of the Sejm (9 October 2011 – 2019)
Minister of Foreign Affairs (November 2015 – January 2018)
Member of the European Parliament (2019 – present)

See also
List of foreign ministers in 2017
List of current foreign ministers

References

External links
 Sejm profile
 San Escobar

1957 births
Living people
Ambassadors of Poland to Iran
Law and Justice politicians
Members of the Polish Sejm 2011–2015
Members of the Polish Sejm 2015–2019
MEPs for Poland 2019–2024
Ministers of Foreign Affairs of Poland
People from Piotrków Trybunalski
University of Łódź alumni
University of Oregon alumni